Kosmos 1541 ( meaning Cosmos 1541) is a Soviet US-K missile early warning satellite which was launched in 1984 as part of the Soviet military's Oko programme. The satellite is designed to identify missile launches using optical telescopes and infrared sensors.

Kosmos 1541 was launched from Site 16/2 at Plesetsk Cosmodrome in the Russian SSR. A Molniya-M carrier rocket with a 2BL upper stage was used to perform the launch, which took place at 17:10 UTC on 6 March 1984. The launch successfully placed the satellite into a molniya orbit. It subsequently received its Kosmos designation, and the international designator 1984-024A. The United States Space Command assigned it the Satellite Catalog Number 14790.

See also

List of Kosmos satellites (1501–1750)
List of R-7 launches (1980-1984)
1984 in spaceflight
List of Oko satellites

References

Kosmos satellites
1984 in spaceflight
Oko
Spacecraft launched by Molniya-M rockets
Spacecraft launched in 1984